Adam M. Morgan (born April 26, 1989) is an American politician, attorney, composer, filmmaker and president of Majesty Music. He is a member of the South Carolina House of Representatives from the 20th District, serving since November 2018. He represents the Eastside of Greenville, South Carolina in the Upstate of South Carolina. He is a member of the Republican Party. Morgan is the son-in-law of singer, songwriter Ron "Patch" Hamilton. 

In 2021 Morgan was elected as the Founding Chairman of the South Carolina Freedom Caucus He also serves on the House Legislative Oversight and Education and Public Works Committees.

Early life and career
Morgan was born in Dallas, Texas, to Tim and Michele Morgan. He graduated with a bachelor's degree from Bob Jones University in 2011, where he served as the student body president. He then graduated with a Juris Doctor (J.D.) from University of South Carolina School of Law in 2015, and became a member of the South Carolina Bar. He is currently the president and co-owner of Majesty Music, a publishing company, recording studio, and music academy headquartered in Greenville, South Carolina. In 2016, he married Megan Hamilton Morgan, daughter of Ron and Shelly Hamilton, and the couple live in Taylors, South Carolina. He has written several songs, children's books, and produced the popular Patch the Pirate children's series since 2014. He served as the writer and executive producer of the 2018 Patch the Pirate animated cartoon, "Operation Arctic: Viking Invasion". In 2018 Morgan successfully ran for the South Carolina House of Representatives.

Songs
Morgan has over 70 songs published, including "Arise" (2015), "The One Who First Loved Me" (2015), "The Greatest Story Ever Told" (2016), "In God We Trust, In God Alone" (2016), "God of Wonders" (2017), "Only One" (2018), "Can It Be" (2019), "Face Your Fears" (2020), "Justified" (2021) and "At the Name of Jesus" (2021). He has co-written several songs with his wife, Megan Morgan, and father-in-law, Ron "Patch" Hamilton.

Discography
 Kilimanjaro (2014)
 Ocean Commotion (2015)
 Operation Arctic: Viking Invasion (2016)
 Shepherd of My Soul (2016)
 Time Twisters (2017)
 Stay the Course (2017)
 The Incredible Race (2018)
 God of Wonders (2018)
 The Final Voyage? (2019)
 Can It Be (2020)
 Mystery Island (2020)
 Justified (2021)
 Whale of a Tale (2021)

Feature films
 Operation Arctic: Viking Invasion (2018)

References

Republican Party members of the South Carolina House of Representatives
Living people
American Christian hymnwriters
Record producers from South Carolina
American radio producers
American lyricists
American Christian writers
Musicians from Greenville, South Carolina
Bob Jones University alumni
1989 births
Songwriters from South Carolina
Writers from Greenville, South Carolina
Actors from Greenville, South Carolina
21st-century American politicians